The Alkass International Cup is an annual under-17 football tournament hosted in Doha, Qatar. It brings together some of the best under-17 teams of clubs around the world.

Format 

Played across 11 days typically in January and February, the tournament has 12 participants split into 4 groups of 3 teams. The first 2 teams in each group advances to the quarter-finals, while the 3rd place teams participate in the 9th-12th place play-offs. After the quarter-finals, 4 teams advance to the semi-finals, while the 4 others play in the 5th-8th place play-offs. Finally, after the semi-finals, 2 teams advance to the final match, while the other 2 play in the 3rd place playoff. The winner of the final is crowned champion.

Broadcasters 
The Alkass International Cup is broadcast by the organizing body of the cup, Alkass Sports. Formerly, it was also broadcast by Eurosport 2.

Performances by teams

References

External links 
 Website

Sports competitions in Doha
International club association football competitions hosted by Qatar
2012 establishments in Qatar
Recurring sporting events established in 2012
Youth football competitions